American OO scale is a model railroad standard that has a scale of 4 mm to 1 foot (1:76) and utilises  for the standard gauge track.

The standard is different from British 00 gauge (which is popular in Great Britain), as it utilises 19mm gauge track rather than HO scale  gauge track.

References 
 http://www.nmra.org/national/sig/AmericanOO.html

4 mm scale